Real Love is the twenty-seventh solo studio album by American singer-songwriter Dolly Parton. It was released on January 21, 1985, by RCA Records. The album was produced by David Malloy, and would be Parton's last studio album for RCA Records. It includes two number one country singles, "Real Love" (a duet with Kenny Rogers) and "Think About Love". The album's other singles, "Don't Call It Love" and "Tie Our Love (In a Double Knot)", peaked at number three and number 17, respectively.

The album was released on LP, 8-track, cassette, and CD in 1985, but went out of print during the early 1990s. It was reissued for the first time during Parton's European tour in 2007 by BMG Germany as part of a two-fer CD, paired with 1983's Burlap & Satin.

Track listing

Personnel
Dolly Parton - vocals
Billy Joe Walker Jr., Dean Parks - guitar
Bob Glaub - bass
Paul Leim - drums
Bobbye Hall, Lenny Castro - percussion
Randy McCormick, Steve Goldstein - keyboards, string arrangements
Tom Scott - saxophone
Gene Morford, Jennifer Kimball, Richard Marx, Terry Williams - backing vocals

Charts

Album

Album (Year-End)

Singles

References

Albums produced by David Malloy
Dolly Parton albums
1985 albums
RCA Records albums